is a Japanese diver. She competed at the 10 metre platform event at the 2008 Summer Olympics and at the 2012 Summer Olympics.

References

External links
 Official blog 
 Twitter

Japanese female divers
Divers at the 2008 Summer Olympics
Divers at the 2012 Summer Olympics
Olympic divers of Japan
1987 births
Living people
Asian Games medalists in diving
Sportspeople from Ishikawa Prefecture
Divers at the 2010 Asian Games
Divers at the 2006 Asian Games
Asian Games silver medalists for Japan
Asian Games bronze medalists for Japan
Medalists at the 2006 Asian Games
Medalists at the 2010 Asian Games
Universiade medalists in diving
Universiade bronze medalists for Japan
Medalists at the 2007 Summer Universiade
Medalists at the 2015 Summer Universiade
21st-century Japanese women